The 2011 Bassetlaw District Council election took place on 5 May 2011 to elect members of Bassetlaw District Council in Nottinghamshire, England as part of the 2011 United Kingdom local elections. One third of the council was up for election. A UK-wide referendum on whether to adopt the Alternative Vote electoral system was also held on this date.
After the election, the composition of the council was:
Labour 27
Conservative 18
Independents 3

Election result

Ward Results

Blyth

Carlton

East Markham

East Retford East

East Retford North

Harworth

Rampton

Ranskill

Sturton

Welbeck

Worksop East

Worksop North

Worksop North East

Worksop North West

Worksop South

Worksop South East

Referendum

Electorate: 84,371
Valid votes cast: 35,198
Turnout: 41.98%
Spoilt ballots: 221

References

2011 English local elections
2011
2010s in Nottinghamshire